Campari Knoepffler (born 10 November 1959) is a Nicaraguan former swimmer. He competed in three events at the 1976 Summer Olympics.

References

1959 births
Living people
Nicaraguan male swimmers
Olympic swimmers of Nicaragua
Swimmers at the 1976 Summer Olympics
Place of birth missing (living people)